Noctis Landing is a landing site of significant interest because it is not only offering a large number and wide range of regions of interest (ROIs) for short-term exploration, but also located strategically at the crossroads between Tharsis and Valles Marineris, which are key for long-term exploration. 

Strategically for long-term exploration, Noctis Landing site allows the shortest possible surface excusions to Tharsis and Valles Marineris (VM). VM is the feature and region on Mars that exposes the longest record of Mars’ geology and evolution through time. Tharsis is the region of Mars that has experienced the longest and most extensive volcanic history, and might still be volcanically active. Some of the youngest lava flows on Mars have been identified on the western flanks of the Tharsis Bulge, i.e., within driving range of future longrange (500 – 1000 km) pressurized rover traverses.

Interactive Mars map

See also 

 Geography of Mars

Notes 

Valleys and canyons on Mars